Prasophyllum viretrum is a species of orchid endemic to Victoria. It has a single tubular, dark green leaf and up to thirty five scented, greenish-brown to brownish flowers and is only known from a few small populations in south-western Victoria.

Description
As with others in the genus, the flowers are inverted so that the labellum is above the column rather than below it. The lateral sepals are a similar length to the dorsal sepal, linear to lance-shaped and spread apart from each other. Flowering occurs from October to December.

Taxonomy and naming
Prasophyllum viretrum was first formally described in 2006 by David Jones and Dean Rouse from a specimen collected at the Pretty Hill Flora Reserve, near Orford and the description was published in Australian Orchid Research. The specific epithet (viretrum) is derived from the Latin word viretum meaning "greensward", "sod" or "turf".

Distribution and habitat
This leek orchid grows in grassland in moist places and is only known from four or five populations in the south-west of the state.

References

External links 
 
 

viretrum
Flora of Victoria
Endemic orchids of Australia
Plants described in 2006